North Park (or NorthPark or Northpark) may refer to:

Shopping malls

United States

 Northpark Plaza Shopping Center, a shopping center in the Northwood community of Irvine, California
 North Park Mall (Indiana), now known as Five Points Mall, a shopping mall in Marion, Indiana
 NorthPark Mall (Iowa), a shopping mall in Davenport, Iowa
 Northpark Mall (Mississippi), a shopping mall in Ridgeland, Mississippi
 Northpark Mall (Missouri), a shopping mall in Joplin, Missouri
 NorthPark Mall (Oklahoma), a shopping mall in Oklahoma City, Oklahoma
 NorthPark Center, a shopping mall in Dallas, Texas

Other places
 Northpark Shopping Centre, a shopping centre near Sefton Park, South Australia, Australia

Educational institutions
 North Park Academy, Public School 66 in the Buffalo Public Schools system of Buffalo, New York, United States
 North Park Collegiate and Vocational School, a public secondary school in Brantford, Ontario, Canada
 North Park Elementary School, site of an April 10, 2017 shooting, San Bernardino, California, United States
 North Park Secondary School, a public secondary school in Brampton, Ontario, Canada
 North Park Theological Seminary, in Chicago, Illinois, United States
 North Park University, formerly known as North Park Junior College, in Chicago, Illinois, United States

Places

United Kingdom
 North Park, Whalsay, hamlet in southwestern Whalsay in the parish of Nesting in the Shetland Islands of Scotland
 North Park House, location of Queen Margaret College in Glasgow, Scotland
 Northpark Copse, a  Site of Special Scientific Interest east of Shalfleet on the Isle of Wight

United States
 North Park Blocks form a city park in downtown Portland, Oregon
 North Park, Buffalo, New York, a neighborhood
 North Park, Chicago, Illinois, a neighborhood
 North Park (Colorado basin), a valley in the Rocky Mountains in north central Colorado
 North Park, Dallas, Texas, a neighborhood also known historically as Elm Thicket
 North Park Formation, a geologic formation in Wyoming
 North Park Natural Area, a protected area of the valley in Jackson County, Colorado
 North Park (Pittsburgh), a county park in Allegheny County, Pennsylvania
 North Park, San Diego, California, a neighborhood
 North Park Theatre, an historical single screen movie house in Buffalo, New York
 North Park Towers, a pair of apartment buildings in Southfield, Michigan

Other places
 North Park Nature Reserve, a protected area along the banks of the Umhlatuzana River, near Queensburgh in KwaZulu-Natal, South Africa
 North Park, Saskatoon, Canada a neighbourhood
 Northpark, New Zealand, a suburb of Auckland

Other uses
 North Park phacelia or Phacelia formosula, a rare species of flowering plant in the borage family

See also
 North Point Park (disambiguation)
 Northpark Mall (disambiguation)